Sam Clancy Jr. (born May 4, 1980) is an American former professional basketball player. He was signed with the NBA's Portland Trail Blazers and Philadelphia 76ers; however, he has never played a game for either team. He was injured as a member of the 76ers, and was waived by the Blazers. He is 6 ft 7 in tall and he weighs 118 kg (260 pounds) and he plays at the position of forward-center.

Amateur career
His father, Sam Clancy Sr., played basketball at University of Pittsburgh, and went on to play defensive end in the NFL for Seattle Seahawks, Cleveland Browns and Indianapolis Colts.  Sam Jr. was born while Sam Sr. was still at Pitt.  During his stint with the Browns, Sam Sr. kept a home in the western Cleveland suburb of Strongsville, OH.

Accordingly, the young Clancy attended St. Edward High School, located in nearby Lakewood, Ohio.  He starred alongside Steve Logan, leading St. Edward to the 1998 Ohio High School Athletic Association State "big school" basketball championship during their senior year. He graduated in 1998.  In 2009, St. Edward named Clancy to the school's Athletic Hall of Fame.

Clancy attended University of Southern California, majoring in sociology, and played basketball for the Trojans. After the 2001 season, he declared for the 2001 NBA draft. However, he never signed with an agent and withdrew his name from consideration prior to the draft. In 2002, which was his senior year, he was named the Pac-10 Player of the Year and Associated Press second team All-American.  He finished his USC career as the all-time leader in blocked shots (195), third all-time in points (1,657), second in rebounds (839), and fifth in steals (134).

In March 2016 Clancy was inducted into the Pac-12 Men's Basketball Hall of Honor, during a ceremony prior to the championship game at the 2016 Pac-12 Men's Basketball Tournament held at the MGM Grand Garden Arena in Las Vegas, Nevada.

Pro career
After his college career, Clancy was selected by the Philadelphia 76ers with the 45th pick (in the 2nd round) of the 2002 NBA draft; however, he missed his entire rookie season with a knee injury, and was waived by the team the following preseason. Clancy ended up never playing a game in the NBA and is 1 of 9 players selected in the 2002 NBA Draft that never played a game in the league.

He has since played in the Continental Basketball Association (CBA) with the Idaho Stampede and in Europe. Clancy was named the CBA's 2004–05 season's Most Valuable Player, Defensive Player of the Year and All-Star Game MVP. He also earned nominations to the All-CBA First Team and All-Defensive Team.

In July 2005, Clancy was drafted with the first pick by the Mankato Mallards of the All-American Professional Basketball League, but he never played a game with the team because the league folded later that year. In October 2005, Clancy was signed to a one-year contract by the Portland Trail Blazers, but he was waived before ever playing a game for them. He also played with the Fayetteville Patriots in the NBA D-League and the Yakima Sun Kings in the CBA.

Clancy has also played overseas for Iraklis Thessaloniki, Cocodrilos de Caracas of the Venezuelan LBP, Incheon ET Land Black Slamer of the Korean Basketball League, the Russian Super League teams UNICS Kazan, Ural Great Perm and CSK VVS Samara, the Spanish ACB League team Grupo Capitol Valladolid, and the French League team Le Mans Sarthe Basket.

In November 2009, Clancy signed with Bnei HaSharon from the Israeli League. In the summer of 2010 he joined Hapoel Jerusalem
 
In November 2011, Sam signed with Atenas de Cordoba from the Argentinian League. After that he become a regular player of the Liga Nacional de Basquet of Argentina and was elected the best foreign player for the 2014–2015 season.

References

External links
NBA.com Player Profile
Euroleague.net Player Profile
USC Trojans Player Profile

1980 births
Living people
African-American basketball players
All-American college men's basketball players
American expatriate basketball people in Argentina
American expatriate basketball people in France
American expatriate basketball people in Greece
American expatriate basketball people in Israel
American expatriate basketball people in Russia
American expatriate basketball people in South Korea
American expatriate basketball people in Spain
American expatriate basketball people in Venezuela
American men's basketball players
Atenas basketball players
Basketball players from Pittsburgh
BC Samara players
BC UNICS players
Bnei HaSharon players
CB Valladolid players
Ciclista Olímpico players
Cocodrilos de Caracas players
CBA All-Star Game players
Fayetteville Patriots players
Gimnasia y Esgrima de Comodoro Rivadavia basketball players
Hapoel Jerusalem B.C. players
Daegu KOGAS Pegasus players
Iraklis Thessaloniki B.C. players
Korean Basketball League players
Le Mans Sarthe Basket players
Liga ACB players
Marinos B.B.C. players
Menorca Bàsquet players
Parade High School All-Americans (boys' basketball)
Philadelphia 76ers draft picks
Power forwards (basketball)
St. Edward High School (Lakewood, Ohio) alumni
USC Trojans men's basketball players
Yakima Sun Kings players
21st-century African-American sportspeople
20th-century African-American people